The fifth season of Deutschland sucht den Superstar live shows began 8 March 2008. It is currently hosted by Marco Schreyl and jury panel, Dieter Bohlen, Anja Lukaseder, and Andreas "Bär" Läsker also star. This season, instead of making top 20 shows (where the boys and girls are split up in two groups of 10 and the viewing public voting for their favorite), the producers decided to make the top 15 live show "Now or Never" and chose the top 10 live to premier in the "Mottoshows" (theme shows) for the upcoming season.

Finalists
(Ages stated at time of contest)

Episode summaries

Top 15 – "Jetzt oder nie" (Now or Never) (contestants not in order) 
Original airdate: 8 March 2008

Advancing to Top 10 (Public votes): Monika, Linda, Fady, Sahra, Thomas

Advancing to Top 10 (Jury selection): Jermaine, Rania, Stella, Collins, Benjamin

Finals

Contestants
Rania Zeriri, born on 6 January 1986, in Enschede, is of Algerian-Dutch ethnicity. Zeriri was born with holes in her vocal cords. In spite of this vocal handicap, she reached a high position.

Benjamin Herd was born in Worms and is the youngest male contestant of this season. He was early disputed, due to both his extravagant behavior and his enduring back-talking disrespect especially to the jury, which eventually led to his voluntary leaving. Jury member Dieter Bohlen then talked Herd back into the competition, where he was finally voted off by the audience on 19 April 2008, just reaching the 6th show.

Thomas Godoj was the winner of the fifth season. He was born in southern Poland, but raised in Recklinghausen.

Fady Maalouf was runner-up of the season. He was born in Zahlé, Lebanon. His song in the finals entitled "Blessed" went straight to number 2 in the German charts upon release, followed by Blessed that also charted at number 2 in the German albums chart.

Top 10 – "Aktuelle Hits" (Greatest Current Hits)
Original airdate: 15 March, 2008ds

Bottom 5: Linda, Fady, Jermaine, Collins, Benjamin

Jury Elimination Forecast: Jermaine, Collins

Jury Best Performance Forecast: Monika or Sahra or Thomas (All)

Eliminated: Jermaine

Top 9 – "Die grössten Filmhits" (Greatest Film Hits)
Original airdate: 22 March 2008

Bottom 5: Linda, Collins, Benjamin, Rania, Sahra

Jury Elimination Forecast: Benjamin, Collins (Dieter), Collins, Rania (Anja), Benjamin (Bär)

Jury Best Performance Forecast: Fady (Dieter, Anja), Monika, Fady (Bär)

Eliminated: Sahra

Top 8 – "Mariah Carey / Take That"
Original airdate: 5 April 2008

Bottom 4: Monika, Benjamin, Rania, Stella

Jury Elimination Forecast: Benjamin (All)

Jury Best Performance Forecast: Thomas (All)

Eliminated: Stella

Guest star Mariah Carey performed her new hit single "Touch My Body" and worked with the contestants backstage. This is the first time that the host spoke English and had an English interview live on the show. As well, casting contestant Mario Teusch sang "Supermario", a techno song of his experience at his audition with the jury.

Top 7 – "Greatest Hits"
Original airdate: 12 April 2008

Bottom 4: Collins, Rania, Benjamin, Thomas

Jury Elimination Forecast: Rania (Dieter), Benjamin or Rania (Anja and Bär)

Jury Best Performance Forecast: Fady or Linda

Eliminated: Collins

Top 6 – "Judges' Choice"
Original airdate: 19 April 2008

Bottom 3: Rania, Benjamin, Monika

Jury Elimination Forecast: Benjamin or Rania (All)

Jury Best Performance Forecast: Linda or Thomas (All)

Eliminated: Benjamin

Top 5: "Party Music and Ballads"
Original airdate: 26 April 2008

Bottom 3: Rania, Thomas, Monika

Jury Elimination Forecast: Rania or Monika (Dieter), Rania (Anja and Bär)

Jury Best Performance Forecast: Didn't say (All)

Eliminated: Rania

Top 4: "Germany vs. England"
Original airdate: 3 May 2008

Bottom: all candidates were in the Bottom Group

Jury Elimination Forecast: Monika (All)

Jury Best Performance Forecast: Didn't say (All)

Eliminated: Monika

Top 3: "Number 1 Hits" / "The Beatles"/ "Dedicated to..."
Original airdate: 10 May 2008

Jury Elimination Forecast: Linda (Anja, Dieter), Fady (Bär)

Jury Best Performance Forecast: Thomas or Fady (Anja, Dieter), Thomas or Linda (Bär)

Eliminated: Linda

Top 2: Finale (Singer's choice, Highlight song & Winner's Single) 
Original airdate: 17 May 2008

Elimination chart

External links
 

Season 05
2008 German television seasons
2008 in German music